Lithuanian Luge Federation is a national governing body of luge sport in Lithuania.

History 
Lithuanian Luge Federation was founded on 11 December 2013 at Vilnius, Lithuania.

On 26 September 2014 Lithuanian Luge Federation joined International Luge Federation as a provisional member.

References 

Luge
2013 establishments in Lithuania
Sports organizations established in 2013
Luge governing bodies
Luge in Lithuania